The 2019 season was the San Francisco Giants' 137th year in Major League Baseball and their 62nd year in San Francisco since their move from New York following the 1957 season. It was their 20th season at Oracle Park and the first under that name following the transfer of naming rights from AT&T. This season was the 13th and last for Bruce Bochy as manager of the Giants. It was the first season since at least 1901 that no Giants pitcher threw a 9 inning complete game. The Giants were officially eliminated from postseason contention for the third consecutive season after a loss to the Braves on September 20.

Events

Offseason
 October 29, 2018 − The Giants exercised the 2019 contract option on LHP Madison Bumgarner and IF Pablo Sandoval.
 December 10, 2018 − The Giants claimed OF Mike Gerber off waivers from Detroit Tigers.
 December 21, 2018 − The Giants agreed to terms with P Pat Venditte.
 January 5, 2019 – The Giants acquired IF/OF Breyvic Valera in a trade with the Baltimore Orioles in exchange for cash considerations.
 January 14, 2019 – The Giants signed LHP Derek Holland to a one-year contract with a club option for 2020.
 January 23, 2019 – The Giants signed LHP Drew Pomeranz to a one-year contract.
 February 1, 2019 − The Giants claimed OF John Andreoli off waivers from Texas Rangers.
 February 5, 2019 – The Giants acquired RHP Jake Barrett in a trade with the Arizona Diamondbacks in exchange for cash considerations. OF John Andreoli was designated for assignment.
 February 12, 2019 − The Giants claimed RHP Jose Lopez off waivers from Cincinnati Reds. LHP Josh Osich was designated for assignment.
 February 13, 2019 – The Giants acquired RHP Trevor Gott in a trade with the Washington Nationals in exchange for cash considerations.
 February 22, 2019 − The Giants claimed IF Hanser Alberto off waivers from Baltimore Orioles. RHP Jake Barrett was designated for assignment.
 March 2, 2019 − The Giants claimed IF Merandy González off waivers from Miami Marlins.
 March 8, 2019 – The Giants acquired cash in a trade with the Detroit Tigers in exchange for minor leaguer C Cameron Rupp.
 March 21, 2019 – The Giants acquired IF/OF Connor Joe in a trade with the Cincinnati Reds in exchange for minor leaguer RHP Jordan Johnson and cash considerations. OF Drew Ferguson was designated for assignment.
 March 23, 2019 – The Giants acquired OF Michael Reed in a trade with the Minnesota Twins in exchange for OF John Andreoli and cash considerations. LHP Steven Okert was designated for assignment.
 March 23, 2019 – The Giants acquired cash in a trade with the Minnesota Twins in exchange for minor leaguer OF Matt Joyce.
 March 23, 2019 – The Giants acquired OF Mike Yastrzemski in a trade with the Baltimore Orioles in exchange for minor leaguer RHP Tyler Herb.
 March 24, 2019 – The Giants acquired C Erik Kratz in a trade with the Milwaukee Brewers in exchange for minor leaguer IF C. J. Hinojosa. RHP Jose Lopez was designated for assignment.

Regular season
 April 2, 2019 – The Giants acquired OF Kevin Pillar in a trade with the Toronto Blue Jays in exchange for minor leaguer RHP Juan De Paula and RHP Derek Law and INF Alen Hanson. OF Michael Reed was designated for assignment.
 April 8, 2019 – The Giants acquired 1B/OF Tyler Austin in a trade with the Minnesota Twins in exchange for minor leaguer OF Malique Ziegler. OF Connor Joe was designated for assignment.
 June 10, 2019 – The Giants acquired OF Alex Dickerson in a trade with the San Diego Padres in exchange for minor leaguer RHP Franklin Van Gurp.
 July 26, 2019 – The Giants traded LHP Derek Holland to the Chicago Cubs in exchange for cash considerations.
 July 31, 2019 – The Giants acquired minor leaguers OF Jaylin Davis, RHP Kai-Wei Teng and RHP Prelander Berroa in a trade with the Minnesota Twins in exchange for RHP Sam Dyson.
 July 31, 2019 – The Giants acquired minor leaguer IF Mauricio Dubón in a trade with the Milwaukee Brewers in exchange for LHP Drew Pomeranz and RHP Ray Black.
 July 31, 2019 – The Giants acquired RHP Dan Winkler and minor leaguer RHP Tristan Beck in a trade with the Atlanta Braves in exchange for RHP Mark Melancon.
 July 31, 2019 – The Giants acquired 2B Scooter Gennett and cash considerations in a trade with the Cincinnati Reds in exchange for a player to be named later.
 August 6, 2019 – The Giants designated 2B Joe Panik for assignment.

Season standings

National League West

National League Division Standings

Record vs. opponents

Game log

|-style="background-color:#fbb;"
| 1 || March 28 || @ Padres || 0–2 || Lauer (1–0) || Bumgarner (0–1) || Yates (1) || 44,655 || 0–1
|-style="background-color:#fbb;"
| 2 || March 29 || @ Padres || 1–4 || Lucchesi (1–0) || Holland (0–1) || Yates (2) || 33,769 || 0–2
|-style="background-color:#bfb;"
| 3 || March 30 || @ Padres || 3–2 || Rodríguez (1–0) || Margevicius (0–1) || Smith (1) || 41,899 || 1–2
|-style="background-color:#fbb;"
| 4 || March 31 || @ Padres || 1–3 || Adam Warren (1–0) || Vincent (0–1) || Yates (3) || 38,444 || 1–3
|-

|-style=background:#bfb;"
| 5 || April 1 || @ Dodgers || 4–2 || Gott (1–0) || Kelly (0–1) || Smith (2) || 40,477 || 2–3
|-style=background:#fbb;"
| 6 || April 2 || @ Dodgers || 5–6 || Ryu (2–0) || Bumgarner (0–2) || Jansen (2) || 42,887 || 2–4
|-style=background:#fbb;"
| 7 || April 3 || @ Dodgers || 3–5 || Alexander (1–0) || Moronta (0–1) || Jansen (3) || 51,170 || 2–5
|-style=background:#fbb;"
| 8 || April 5 || Rays || 2–5 || Glasnow (2–0) || Rodríguez (1–1) || Alvarado (3) || 41,067 || 2–6 
|-style=background:#bfb;"
| 9 || April 6 || Rays || 6–4 || Bergen (1–0) || Yarbrough (1–1) || Smith (3) || 31,828 || 3–6
|-style=background:#fbb;"
| 10 || April 7 || Rays || 0–3 || Chirinos (2–0) || Pomeranz (0–1) || Alvarado (4) || 31,574 || 3–7  
|-style=background:#fbb;"
| 11 || April 8 || Padres || 5–6 || Lauer (2–1) || Moronta (0–2) || Yates (6) || 28,625 || 3–8
|-style=background:#bfb;"
| 12 || April 9 || Padres || 7–2 || Holland (1–1) || Lucchesi (2–1) || – || 28,506 || 4–8
|-style=background:#fbb;"
| 13 || April 10 || Padres || 1–3 || Margevicius (1–1) || Rodríguez (1–2) || Yates (7) || 28,584 || 4–9
|-style=background:#bfb;"
| 14 || April 11 || Rockies || 1–0 || Samardzija (1–0) || Gray (0–3) || Smith (4) || 29,727 || 5–9
|-style=background:#bfb;"
| 15 || April 12 || Rockies || 3–2  || Bergen (2–0) || Johnson (0–1) || – || 33,616 || 6–9
|-style=background:#bfb;"
| 16 || April 13 || Rockies || 5–2 || Bumgarner (1–2) || Freeland (1–3) || Dyson (1) || 32,607 || 7–9
|-style=background:#fbb;"
| 17 || April 14 || Rockies || 0–4 || Márquez (2–1) || Holland (1–2) || – || 35,513 || 7–10
|-style=background:#bfb;"
| 18 || April 16 || @ Nationals || 7–3 || Rodríguez (2–2) || Strasburg (1–1) || – || 22,334 || 8–10 
|-style=background:#fbb;"
| 19 || April 17 || @ Nationals || 6–9 || Hellickson (2–0) || Samardzija (1–1) || – || 22,611 || 8–11
|-style=background:#fbb;"
| 20 || April 18 || @ Nationals || 2–4 || Corbin (1–0) || Pomeranz (0–2) || Doolittle (2) || 26,085 || 8–12
|-style=background:#fbb;”
| 21 || April 19 || @ Pirates || 1–4 || Lyles (2–0) || Bumgarner (1–3) || Vázquez (6) || 15,049 || 8–13
|-style=background:#fbb;”
| 22 || April 20 || @ Pirates || 1–3 (5) || Taillon (1–2) || Holland (1–3) || – || 17,663 || 8–14
|-style=background:#bfb;"
| 23 || April 21 || @ Pirates || 3–2 || Rodríguez (3–2) || Archer (1–1) || Smith (5) || 12,396 || 9–14
|-style=background:#bfb;"
| 24 || April 23 || @ Blue Jays || 7–6 || Samardzija (2–1) || Thornton (0–3) || Smith (6) || 20,384 || 10–14
|-style=background:#bfb;"
| 25 || April 24 || @ Blue Jays || 4–0 || Pomeranz (1–2) || Buchholz (0–1) || – || 19,652 || 11–14
|-style=background:#fbb;”
| 26 || April 26 || Yankees || 3–7 || Paxton (3–2) || Bumgarner (1–4) || – || 34,950 || 11–15
|-style=background:#fbb;”
| 27 || April 27 || Yankees || 4–6 || Happ (1–2) || Holland (1–4) || Chapman (5) || 33,971 || 11–16
|-style=background:#fbb;”
| 28 || April 28 || Yankees || 5–11 || Germán (5–1) || Rodríguez (3–3) || – || 34,540 || 11–17
|-style=background:#bfb;"
| 29 || April 29 || Dodgers || 3–2 || Dyson (1–0) || Stripling (1–2) || Smith (7) || 32,212 || 12–17
|-style=background:#fbb;”
| 30 || April 30 || Dodgers || 3–10 || Buehler (3–0) || Pomeranz (1–3) || – || 32,017 || 12–18
|-

|-style=background:#bfb;"
| 31 || May 1 || Dodgers || 2–1 || Smith (1–0) || Urías (2–2) || – || 31,960 || 13–18
|-style=background:#bfb;"
| 32 || May 3 || @ Reds || 12–11  || Moronta (1–2) || Hughes (2–1) || Smith (8) || 23,478 || 14–18
|-style=background:#fbb;”
| 33 || May 4 || @ Reds || 2–9 || Roark (2–1) || Rodríguez (3–4) || – || 24,104 || 14–19
|-style=background:#bfb;"
| 34 || May 5 || @ Reds || 6–5 || Watson (1–0) || Iglesias (1–5) || Smith (9) || 23,654 || 15–19
|-style=background:#fbb;"
| 35 || May 6 || @ Reds || 4–12 || DeSclafani (2–1) || Pomeranz (1–4) || – || 19,476 || 15–20
|-style=background:#bfb;"
| 36 || May 7 || @ Rockies || 14–4 || Bumgarner (2–4) || Senzatela (2–2) || – || 21,707 || 16–20 
|-style=background:#fbb;"
| 37 || May 8 || @ Rockies || 11–12 || Shaw (2–0) || Beede (0–1) || Davis (6) || 25,368 || 16–21
|-style=background:#bbb
| – || May 9 || @ Rockies ||Colspan=7|Postponed (rain): Makeup date July 15
|-style=background:#fbb;"
| 38 || May 10 || Reds || 0–7 || Castillo (4–1) || Rodríguez (3–5) || – || 32,191 || 16–22 
|-style=background:#fbb
| 39 || May 11 || Reds || 4–5 || Garrett (2–1) || Moronta (1–3) || Iglesias (8) || 32,829 || 16–23
|-style=background:#bfb;"
| 40 || May 12 || Reds || 6–5 || Watson (2–0) || Hernandez (0–2) || Smith (10) || 35,824 || 17–23 
|-style=background:#fbb 
| 41 || May 14 || Blue Jays || 3–7 || Thornton (1–4) || Vincent (0–2) || – || 31,230 || 17–24
|-style=background:#bfb;" 
| 42 || May 15 || Blue Jays || 4–3 || Melancon (1–0) || Tepera (0–2) || Smith (11) || 31,828 || 18–24
|-style=background:#fbb
| 43 || May 17 || @ Diamondbacks || 0–7 || Kelly (4–4) || Samardzija (2–2) || – || 26,806 || 18–25
|-style=background:#bfb
| 44 || May 18 || @ Diamondbacks || 8–5 || Bumgarner (3–4) || Godley (1–4) || – || 25,014 || 19–25
|-style=background:#bfb
| 45 || May 19 || @ Diamondbacks || 3–2  || Dyson (2–0) || Hirano (1–2) || Smith (12) || 24,061 || 20–25
|-style=background:#fbb
| 46 || May 20 || Braves || 1–4 || Soroka (5–1) || Suarez (0–1) || Newcomb (1) || 29,815 || 20–26
|-style=background:#bfb
| 47 || May 21 || Braves || 4–3 || Gott (2–0) || Jackson (2–1) ||  || 28,030 || 21–26
|-style=background:#fbb
| 48 || May 22 || Braves || 2–9 || Fried (7–2) || Samardzija (2–3) ||  || 31,402 || 21–27 
|-style=background:#fbb
| 49 || May 23 || Braves || 4–5 (13) || Jackson (3–1) || Moronta (1–4) ||  || 32,463 || 21–28
|-style=background:#fbb
|| 50 || May 24 || Diamondbacks || 2–18 || Ray (4–1) || Pomeranz (1–5) || Godley (2) || 31,777 || 21–29
|-style=background:#fbb
| 51 || May 25 || Diamondbacks || 4–10 || Clarke (1–1) || Suarez (0–2) || – || 31,531 || 21–30
|-style=background:#fbb
| 52 || May 26 || Diamondbacks || 2–6 || Weaver (4–3) || Anderson (0–1) || Holland (9) || 37,017 || 21–31
|-style=background:#fbb
| 53 || May 28 || @ Marlins || 3–11 || Richards (2–5) || Samardzija (2–4) || – || 6,407 || 21–32
|-style=background:#fbb
| 54 || May 29 || @ Marlins || 2–4 || Anderson (2–2) || Bumgarner (3–5) || Romo (11) || 6,487 || 21–33
|-style=background:#bfb
| 55 || May 30 || @ Marlins || 3–1 || Moronta (2–4) || Conley (1–5) || Smith (13) || 7,371 || 22–33
|-style=background:#fbb
|| 56 || May 31 || @ Orioles || 6–9 || Cashner (6–2) || Pomeranz (1–6) || Bleier (2) || 17,545 || 22–34
|-

|-style=background:#bfb
| 57 || June 1 || @ Orioles || 8–2 || Anderson (1–1) || Hess (1–7) || — || 19,352 || 23–34
|-style=background:#bfb
| 58 || June 2 || @ Orioles || 8–1 || Samardzija (3–4)|| Ynoa (0–2) || — || 16,991 || 24–34 
|-style=background:#bfb
| 59 || June 4 || @ Mets || 9–3 (10) || Melancon (2–0) || Gsellman (1–1) || — || 24,878 || 25–34
|-style=background:#fbb
| 60 || June 5 || @ Mets || 0–7 || Vargas (2–3) || Beede (0–2) || — || 23,357 || 25–35
|-style=background:#fbb
| 61 || June 6 || @ Mets || 3–7 || Lugo (3–0) || Melancon (2–1) || — || 28,857 || 25–36
|-style=background:#bfb
| 62 || June 7 || Dodgers || 2–1 || Moronta (3–4) || Kershaw (5–1) || Smith (14) || 35,157 || 26–36
|-style=background:#fbb
| 63 || June 8 || Dodgers || 2–7 || Hill (3–1) || Samardzija (3–5) || — || 37,784 || 26–37
|-style=background:#fbb
| 64 || June 9 || Dodgers || 0–1 || Buehler (7–1) || Bumgarner (3–6) || Jansen (19) || 34,098 || 26–38 
|-style=background:#bfb
| 65 || June 11 || Padres || 6–5 || Melancon (3–1) || Wingenter (0–1) || Smith (15) || 28,535 || 27–38
|-style=background:#bfb
| 66 || June 12 || Padres || 4–2 || Anderson (2–1) || Lucchesi (5–4) || Smith (16) || 31,188 || 28–38
|-style=background:#bfb
| 67 || June 14 || Brewers || 5–3 || Pomeranz (2–6) || Davies (7–1) || Smith (17) || 35,106 || 29–38
|-style=background:#bfb
| 68 || June 15 || Brewers || 8–7 || Gott (3–0) || Guerra (2–1) || Smith (18) || 34,560 || 30–38
|-style=background:#fbb
| 69 || June 16 || Brewers || 3–5 || Albers (3–2) || Samardzija (3–6) || Hader (17) || 34,603 || 30–39
|-style=background:#bfb
| 70 || June 17 || @ Dodgers || 3–2 || Beede (1–2) || Maeda (7–4) || Smith (19) || 42,479 || 31–39
|-style=background:#fbb
| 71 || June 18 || @ Dodgers || 0–9 || Kershaw (7–1) || Anderson (2–2) ||  || 48,219 || 31–40
|-style=background:#fbb
| 72 || June 19 || @ Dodgers || 2–9 || Floro (2–1) || Pomeranz (2–7) || — || 43,802 || 31–41
|-style=background:#fbb
| 73 || June 20 || @ Dodgers || 8–9 || Chargois (1–0) || Bumgarner (3–7) || Jansen (22) || 43,724 || 31–42
|-style=background:#bfb
| 74 || June 21 || @ Diamondbacks || 11–5 || Samardzija (4–6) || Clarke (1–3) || — || 29,312 || 32–42
|-style=background:#bfb
| 75 || June 22 || @ Diamondbacks || 7–4 || Gott (4–0) || Godley (3–5) || Smith (20) || 32,082 || 33–42
|-style=background:#fbb
| 76 || June 23 || @ Diamondbacks || 2–3  || Andriese (4–4) || Melancon (3–2) || — || 25,071 || 33–43
|-style=background:#fbb
| 77 || June 24 || Rockies || 0–2 || Gray (8–5) || Pomeranz (2–8) || Davis (10) || 30,018 || 33–44
|-style=background:#bfb
| 78 || June 25 || Rockies || 4–2 || Bumgarner (4–7) || Gonzalez (0–1) || Smith (21) || 31,458 || 34–44
|-style=background:#fbb
| 79 || June 26 || Rockies || 3–6 || Márquez (8–3) || Samardzija (4–7) || Davis (11) || 33,765 || 34–45
|-style=background:#fbb
| 80 || June 27 || Diamondbacks || 1–5 || Young (1–0) || Beede (1–3) || — || 30,790 || 34–46
|-style=background:#bfb
| 81 || June 28 || Diamondbacks || 6–3 || Anderson (3–2) || Kelly (7–8) || — || 35,391 || 35–46
|-style=background:#fbb
| 82 || June 29 || Diamondbacks || 3–4 || Greinke (9–3) || Dyson (2–1) || Holland (12) || 31,600 || 35–47
|-style=background:#bfb
| 83 || June 30 || Diamondbacks || 10–4 || Bumgarner (5–7) || Ray (5–6) || — || 31,778 || 36–47
|-

|-style=background:#bfb
| 84 || July 1 || @ Padres || 13–2 || Samardzija (5–7) || Allen (2–1) || — || 25,274 || 37–47
|-style=background:#bfb
| 85 || July 2 || @ Padres || 10–4 || Beede (2–3) || Strahm (3–7) || — || 24,007 || 38–47 
|-style=background:#bfb
| 86 || July 3 || @ Padres || 7–5 || Gott (5–0) || Perdomo (1–1) || Smith (22) || 33,905 || 39–47
|-style=background:#fbb
| 87 || July 5 || Cardinals || 4–9 || Hudson (7–4) || Pomeranz (2–9) || — || 37,603 || 39–48
|-style=background:#bfb
| 88 || July 6 || Cardinals || 8–4 || Dyson (3–1) || Mikolas (5–9) || —  || 32,487 || 40–48
|-style=background:#bfb
| 89 || July 7 || Cardinals || 1–0 || Samardzija (6–7) || Flaherty (4–6) || Smith (23) || 33,841 || 41–48
|-style=background:#bbbfff
| – || July 9 || colspan="8"|90th All-Star Game in Cleveland, OH
|-style=background:#bfb
| 90 || July 12 || @ Brewers || 10–7  || Smith (2–0) || Albers (4–3) || — || 40,186 || 42–48
|-style=background:#fbb
| 91 || July 13 || @ Brewers || 4–5 || Jeffress (3–2) || Moronta (3–5) || — || 42,324 || 42–49
|-style=background:#bfb
| 92 || July 14 || @ Brewers || 8–3 || Beede (3–3) || Burnes (1–5) || — || 43,259 || 43–49
|-style=background:#bfb
| 93 || July 15 || @ Rockies || 19–2 || Samardzija (7–7) || Márquez (8–5) || —  || 26,434 || 44–49
|-style=background:#bfb
| 94 || July 15 || @ Rockies || 2–1 || Rodríguez (4–5) || Gonzalez (0–2) || Smith (24) || 34,424 || 45–49
|-style=background:#bfb
| 95 || July 16 || @ Rockies || 8–4  || Smith (3–0) || Davis (1–4) || — || 47,413 || 46–49
|-style=background:#bfb
| 96 || July 17 || @ Rockies || 11–8 || Holland (2–4) || Gray (9–7) || Melancon (1) || 40,157 || 47–49
|-style=background:#bfb
| 97 || July 18 || Mets || 3–2 (16) || Jerez (1–0) || Mazza (0–1) || — || 36,862 || 48–49
|-style=background:#bfb
| 98 || July 19 || Mets || 1–0 (10) || Dyson (4–1) || Rhame (0–1) || — || 32,861 || 49–49
|-style=background:#fbb
| 99 || July 20 || Mets || 4–11 || Lockett (1–1) || Samardzija (7–8) || — || 33,860 || 49–50
|-style=background:#bfb
| 100 || July 21 || Mets || 3–2 (12) ||  Gott (6–0) || Gsellman (1–2) || — || 35,406 || 50–50 
|-style=background:#bfb
| 101 || July 22 || Cubs || 5–4 || Gott (7–0) || Strop (2–4) || Dyson (2) || 37,119 || 51–50
|-style=background:#bfb
| 102 || July 23 || Cubs || 5–4  (13)  || Coonrod (1–0) || Brach (3–3) || — || 39,747 || 52–50
|-style=background:#fbb
| 103 || July 24 || Cubs || 1–4 || Ryan (3–1) || Beede (3–4) || Kimbrel (7) || 37,746 || 52–51
|-style=background:#bfb
| 104 || July 26 || @ Padres || 2–1  (11)  || Melancon (4–2) || Allen (2–3) || Smith (25) || 41,951 || 53–51
|-style=background:#fbb
| 105 || July 27 || @ Padres || 1–5 || Quantrill (4–2) || Anderson (3–3) || — || 41,371 || 53–52
|-style=background:#bfb
| 106 || July 28 || @ Padres || 7–6 || Bumgarner (6–7) || Perdomo (1–3) || Smith (26) || 35,087 || 54–52
|-style=background:#fbb
| 107 || July 30 || @ Phillies || 2–4 || Smyly (2–5) || Beede (3–5) || Neris (19) || 32,217 || 54–53
|-style=background:#bfb
| 108 || July 31 || @ Phillies || 5–1 || Samardzija (8–8) || Velasquez (3–6) || — || 31,313 || 55–53
|-

|-style=background:#fbb
| 109 || August 1 || @ Phillies || 2–10 || Álvarez (2–2) || Rodríguez (4–6) || — || 28,524 || 55–54
|-style=background:#fbb
| 110 || August 2 || @ Rockies || 4–5 || Díaz (4–2) || Moronta (3–6) || Oberg (4) || 40,672 || 55–55
|-style=background:#bfb
| 111 || August 3 || @ Rockies || 6–5 || Coonrod (2–0) || Estévez (1–2) || Smith (27) || 47,540 || 56–55
|-style=background:#fbb
| 112 || August 4 || @ Rockies || 3–9 || Freeland (3–9) || Beede (3–6) || — || 40,084 || 56–56
|-style=background:#fbb
| 113 || August 5 || Nationals || 0–4 || Fedde (2–2) || Samardzija (8–9) || — || 32,366 || 56–57
|-style=background:#fbb
| 114 || August 6 || Nationals || 3–5 || Sánchez (7–6) || Menez (0–1) || Doolittle (25) || 31,628 || 56–58
|-style=background:#fbb
| 115 || August 7 || Nationals || 1–4 || Ross (2–3) || Anderson (3–4) || — || 30,958 || 56–59
|-style=background:#bfb
| 116 || August 8 || Phillies || 5–0 || Bumgarner (7–7) || Nola (10–3) || — || 37,667 || 57–59
|-style=background:#fbb
| 117 || August 9 || Phillies || 6–9 || Álvarez (3–2) || Watson (2–1) || Neris (20) || 36,275 || 57–60 
|-style=background:#bfb
| 118 || August 10 || Phillies || 3–1 || Samardzija (9–9) || Velasquez (4–7) || Smith (28) || 39,106 || 58–60 
|-style=background:#bfb
| 119 || August 11 || Phillies || 9–6 || Smith (4–0) || Álvarez (3–3) || — || 36,637 || 59–60
|-style=background:#bfb
| 120 || August 13 || Athletics || 3–2 || Bumgarner (8–7) || Anderson (10–8) || Smith (29) || 36,663 || 60–60 
|-style=background:#fbb
| 121 || August 14 || Athletics || 5–9 || Bailey (10–8) || Beede (3–7) || Hendriks (13) || 39,511 || 60–61
|-style=background:#bfb
| 122 || August 15 || @ Diamondbacks || 7–0 || Rodríguez (5–6) || Young (4–3) || — || 19,037 || 61–61
|-style=background:#bfb
| 123 || August 16 || @ Diamondbacks || 10–9  || Smith (5–0) || Lopez (1–5) || Gott (1) || 23,642 || 62–61
|-style=background:#bfb
| 124 || August 17 || @ Diamondbacks || 11–6 || Webb (1–0) || Clarke (4–4) || — || 35,366 || 63–61
|-style=background:#fbb
| 125 || August 18 || @ Diamondbacks || 1–6 || Kelly (9–12) || Bumgarner (8–8) || — || 26,079 || 63–62
|-style=background:#fbb
| 126 || August 20 || @ Cubs || 3–5 || Hamels (7–4) || Abad (0–1) || Kimbrel (10) || 36,969 || 63–63
|-style=background:#fbb
| 127 || August 21 || @ Cubs || 11–12 || Kintzler (3–2) || Moronta (6–2) || Kimbrel (11) || 38,619 || 63–64
|-style=background:#fbb
| 128 || August 22 || @ Cubs || 0–1 || Hendricks  (9–9) || Samardzija (9–10) || Wick (2) || 36,366 || 63–65
|-style=background:#bfb
| 129 || August 24 || @ Athletics || 10–5 || Coonrod (3–0) || Petit (3–3) || — || 53,367 || 64–65
|-style=background:#bfb
| 130 || August 25 || @ Athletics || 5–4 || Coonrod (4–0) || Diekman (1–7) || Smith (30) || 47,321 || 65–65
|-style=background:#fbb
| 131 || August 26 || Diamondbacks || 4–6 || Young (6–3) || Beede (3–8) || Bradley (8) || 29,169 || 65–66
|-style=background:#fbb
| 132 || August 27 || Diamondbacks || 2–3 || Leake (10–10) || Coonrod (4–1) || Bradley (9) || 28,262 || 65–67
|-style=background:#fbb
| 133 || August 29 || Padres || 3–5 || Paddack (8–7) || Rodríguez (5–7) || Muñoz (1) || 33,135 || 65–68
|-style=background:#bfb
| 134 || August 30 || Padres || 8–3 || Bumgarner (9–8) || Lamet (2–3) || — || 34,293 || 66–68
|-style=background:#fbb
| 135 || August 31 || Padres || 1–4 || Stammen (7–6) || Watson (2–2) || Yates (39) || 36,424 || 66–69
|-

|-style=background:#fbb
| 136 || September 1 || Padres || 4–8 || Lauer (8–8) || Samardzija (9–11) || — || 38,701 || 66–70
|-style=background:#fbb
| 137 || September 2 || @ Cardinals || 1–3 || Wainwright (10–9) || Beede (3–9) || Martínez (17) || 40,732 || 66–71
|-style=background:#fbb
| 138 || September 3 || @ Cardinals || 0–1 || Flaherty (9–7) || Rodríguez (5–8) || Martínez (18) || 38,259 || 66–72
|-style=background:#bfb
| 139 || September 4 || @ Cardinals || 9–8 || Rogers (1–0) || Gallegos (3–2) || Smith (31) || 41,945 || 67–72
|-style=background:#fbb
| 140 || September 5 || @ Cardinals || 0–10 || Hudson (15–6) || Webb (1–1) || Cabrera (1) || 36,800 || 67–73
|-style=background:#cfc
| 141 || September 6 || @ Dodgers || 5–4 || Samardzija (10–11) || Kershaw (13–5) || Smith (32) || 53,317 || 68–73
|-style=background:#cfc
| 142 || September 7 || @ Dodgers || 1–0 || Beede (4–9) || Gonsolin (2–2) || Gustave (1) || 53,870 || 69–73
|-style=background:#fbb
| 143 || September 8 || @ Dodgers || 0–5 || Maeda (9–8) || Rodríguez (5–9) || — || 52,310 || 69–74
|-style=background:#fbb
| 144 || September 9 || Pirates || 4–6 || Rodríguez (4–5) || Abad (0–2) || Vazquez (26) || 26,826 || 69–75
|-style=background:#cfc
| 145 || September 10 || Pirates || 5–4 || Cueto (1–0) || Keller (1–4) || Anderson (1) || 26,877 || 70–75
|-style=background:#fbb
| 146 || September 11 || Pirates || 3–6 || Feliz (3–4) || Webb (1–2) || Vázquez (27) || 26,627 || 70–76
|-style=background:#fbb
| 147 || September 12 || Pirates || 2–4 || Musgrove (10–12) || Samardzija (10–12) || Vazquez (28) || 30,918 || 70–77
|-style=background:#cfc
| 148 || September 13 || Marlins || 1–0 || Beede (5–9) || Alcántara (5–13) || Anderson (2) || 33,418 || 71–77
|-style=background:#fbb
| 149 || September 14 || Marlins || 2–4 || García (3–1) || Anderson (3–5) || Ureña (2) || 38,663 || 71–78
|-style=background:#cfc
| 150 || September 15 || Marlins || 2–1 || Rogers (2–0) || García (3–2)  || Smith (33) || 39,663 || 72–78
|-style=background:#cfc
| 151 || September 17 || @ Red Sox || 7–6 (15) || Rodríguez (6–9) || Kelley (0–2) || — || 35,925 || 73–78
|-style=background:#cfc
| 152 || September 18 || @ Red Sox || 11–3 || Samardzija (11–12) || Chacin (3–11) || — || 35,697 || 74–78 
|-style=background:#fbb
| 153 || September 19 || @ Red Sox || 4–5 || Rodríguez (18–6) || Bumgarner (9–9) || Workman (15) || 35,816 || 74–79
|-style=background:#fbb
| 154 || September 20 || @ Braves || 0–6 || Foltynewicz (8–5) || Beede (5–10) || — || 37,419 || 74–80
|-style=background:#fbb
| 155 || September 21 || @ Braves || 1–8 || Fried (17–6) || Cueto (1–1) || — || 40,899 || 74–81
|-style=background:#cfc
| 156 || September 22 || @ Braves || 4–1 || Webb (2–2)  || Keuchel (8–7) || Smith (34) || 33,674 || 75–81
|-style=background:#fbb
| 157 || September 24 || Rockies || 5–8  || Howard (2–0) || Rodríguez (6–10) || Shaw (1) || 27,870 || 75–82
|-style=background:#cfc
| 158 || September 25 || Rockies || 2–1 || Smith (6–0) || Johnson (0–2) || — || 29,175 || 76–82
|-style=background:#cfc
| 159 || September 26 || Rockies || 8–3 || Coonrod (5–1) || Tinoco (0–3) || — || 30,350 || 77–82
|-style=background:#fbb
| 160 || September 27 || Dodgers || 2–9 || Buehler (14–4) || Cueto (1–2) || — || 36,554 || 77–83
|-style=background:#fbb
| 161 || September 28 || Dodgers || 0–2 || Ryu (14–5) || Webb (2–3) || Jansen (33) || 37,518 || 77–84
|-style=background:#fbb
| 162 || September 29 || Dodgers || 0–9 || May (2–3) || Rodríguez (6–11) || — || 41,909 || 77–85
|-

|- style="text-align:center;"
| Legend:       = Win       = Loss       = PostponementBold = Giants team member

Roster

Farm system

References

External links
San Francisco Giants 2019 Schedule at MLB.com
2019 San Francisco Giants season at Baseball Reference

San Francisco Giants
San Francisco Giants seasons
San Francisco Giants